All Things Set Aside is the debut studio album by American metalcore band Veil of Maya. It was self-produced and released on November 7, 2006, through Corrosive Recordings. It is the only album to feature original vocalist Adam Clemans and guitarist Bryan Ruppell.

In-depth information
All songs on the album were written and recorded by Veil of Maya, with the exception of the final track titled "The Session", which is a rap song, written and recorded by Chicago rappers Vigor Lynx, Getatem, Mike J, MO and DJ Robert.

This is the only Veil of Maya recording with two separate guitar players, as afterward Marc Okubo played both rhythm and lead guitars on the band's studio recordings. This is also the only album with vocalist Adam Clemans.

The songs "Entry Level Exit Wounds" and "Sever the Voices" were recorded for the band's proceeding album, The Common Man's Collapse with the band's succeeding vocalist Brandon Butler.

Track listing

Personnel
Veil of Maya
 Adam Clemans - vocals
 Marc Okubo - lead guitar
 Bryan Ruppell - rhythm guitar
 Sammy Applebaum - drums
 Kris Higler - bass guitar

Additional personnel
Artwork by Michael Adler
Production by Veil of Maya on tracks 1-8
Production on track 9 by Mike J.

References

2006 debut albums
Veil of Maya albums